Sebastián Villa Cano (born 19 May 1996) is a Colombian professional footballer who plays for Argentine Primera División club Boca Juniors.

Club career
Villa had previously played for Deportes Tolima, with whom he won the 2018 Categoría Primera A (Torneo Apertura), before joining Boca Juniors in the summer of the same year.

Villa made his debut in the Argentine Primera División on 12 August 2018 against Talleres de Córdoba. He scored his first goal for Boca in only his fourth appearance, a 3–0 home victory  against Club Atlético Vélez Sarsfield on 3 September 2018.

International career
Villa was called up to the Colombia national football team on 29 August 2018. He made his debut against Venezuela on September 8, 2018.

Honours
Deportes Tolima
 Copa Colombia: 2014
 Primera A: 2018 Apertura

Boca Juniors
 Primera División: 2019–20, 2022
 Copa Argentina: 2019–20
 Copa de la Liga Profesional: 2020, 2022
 Supercopa Argentina: 2018, 2022

References

External links

1996 births
Living people
Colombian footballers
Association football forwards
Colombian expatriate footballers
Expatriate footballers in Argentina
Deportes Tolima footballers
Boca Juniors footballers
Colombian expatriate sportspeople in Argentina
Colombia international footballers
People from Antioquia